Bartolomeo Riberi, O. de M. (19 August, 1640 – 8 December 1702) was a Roman Catholic prelate who served as Bishop of Nicotera (1691–1702).

Biography
Bartolomeo Riberi was born in Fronteira on 19 August 1640 and ordained a priest in the Order of Our Lady of Mercy on 17 March 1668.
On 12 November 1691, he was appointed during the papacy of Pope Innocent XII as Bishop of Nicotera.
On 18 November 1691, he was consecrated bishop by Pedro de Salazar Gutiérrez de Toledo, Bishop of Córdoba, with Giuseppe Felice Barlacci, Bishop Emeritus of Narni, and Pietro Vecchia (bishop), Bishop Emeritus of Andria, serving as co-consecrators. 
He served as Bishop of Nicotera until his death on 8 December 1702.

References 

17th-century Italian Roman Catholic bishops
18th-century Italian Roman Catholic bishops
Bishops appointed by Pope Innocent XII
1640 births
1702 deaths
People from Fronteira, Portugal